Dichomeris ptilocompa is a moth in the family Gelechiidae. It was described by Edward Meyrick in 1922. It is found in Brazil and Peru.

The forewings are leaden grey with a moderate slightly oblique blackish fascia before the middle, not reaching the costa, edged with ochreous yellow. There is a small round dark fuscous spot edged with ochreous yellow on the end of cell, well separated from the following fascia. There is a broad blackish fascia from three-fourths of the costa to the tornus, anteriorly edged by a rather oblique ochreous-yellow line indented in the middle. There are also subconfluent triangular blackish marginal dots around the apex and termen, separated anteriorly by ochreous-whitish or yellowish dots. The hindwings are dark grey.

References

Moths described in 1922
ptilocompa